Cañoneros de Campeche is a Mexican football club based in Campeche, Mexico, Mexico. The club was founded in 2011  and plays in the Liga Premier of the Segunda División de México

Current squad

References

External links
 Cañoneros de Campeche 

Football clubs in Campeche
Association football clubs established in 1999
Ascenso MX teams
1999 establishments in Mexico